Paulette Guajardo is an American politician currently serving as the mayor of Corpus Christi, Texas. Guajardo had previously served as a city council member.

Mayor of Corpus Christi, Texas
Paulette Guajardo first announced her campaign for mayor on August 13, 2020. Following a stall during the November 3 election, the mayoral race was directed into a runoff election. The runoff election for mayor was held on December 15, 2020, with Guajardo defeating Joe McComb, the incumbent mayor. On January 12, 2021, Guajardo was sworn in as mayor of Corpus Christi.

See also
List of mayors of Corpus Christi, Texas

References

External links

21st-century American politicians
Mayors of Corpus Christi, Texas
Living people
Hispanic and Latino American mayors in Texas
Hispanic and Latino American women in politics
Women mayors of places in Texas
Year of birth missing (living people)
21st-century American women politicians